The 1897 Arizona Normal Normals football team was an American football team that represented the Arizona Normal School (later renamed Arizona State University) as an independent during the 1897 college football season. In its first season of varsity football, the Tempe Normal team compiled a 0–1 record, losing to the Phoenix Indian School by a 38 to 20 score. The team captain was Walter Shute.

The Arizona Normal football program was organized by Frederick M. Irish who came to Arizona Normal School in 1896 as a science teacher after graduating from the University of Iowa. He remained the football coach at Arizona Normal for the program's first seven years.

Schedule

References

Arizona Normal
Arizona State Sun Devils football seasons
College football winless seasons
Arizona Normal Normals football